Caligus musaicus is a sea louse species that parasitises the European flounder (Platichthys flesus); it was discovered off Portugal.

References

Siphonostomatoida
Crustaceans of the Atlantic Ocean
Crustaceans described in 2010